COPD26 Chronic obstructive pulmonary disease QTL 26 [ Homo sapiens (human) ] is the title of a discontinued record in the National Center for Biotechnology Information Gene database. The record - Gene ID: 544437, has been discontinued on 3 May 2019.

References 

Diseases and disorders